Mindaugas Urbaitis (born 1952) is a Lithuanian composer. He was originally known as a radical minimalist. but began to use more recognisable musical quotes from the 1980s.

References

1952 births
Living people
Date of birth missing (living people)

lt:Mindaugas Urbaitis